The 2004 Campeonato Nacional Clausura Copa Banco del Estado  was the 76th Chilean League top flight, in which Cobreloa won its 8th league title after beating Unión Española in the finals.

Qualifying stage

Results

Group standings

Group A

Group B

Group C

Group D

Aggregate table

Repechaje

Playoffs

First round

Knockout stage

Finals

Top goalscorers

References

External links
RSSSF Chile 2004

Primera División de Chile seasons
Chile
2004 in Chilean football